Manoel Pereira da Silva (born 1 June 1919) is a Portuguese former sports shooter. He competed in the 50 metre rifle, three positions event at the 1960 Summer Olympics.

References

External links
 

1919 births
Possibly living people
Portuguese male sport shooters
Olympic shooters of Portugal
Shooters at the 1960 Summer Olympics
Sportspeople from Braga